WDMP-FM (99.3 FM) is a radio station broadcasting a Country music format. Licensed to Dodgeville, Wisconsin, United States, the station serves the Southwest Wisconsin and West Madison Metropolitan area.  The station is currently owned by Dodge Point Broadcasting Co. Prior to broadcasting on 99.3 MHz, WDMP-FM was originally located at 107.1 on the FM dial.

References

External links

Country radio stations in the United States
DMP-FM